Joseph Sobek (April 5, 1918 – March 27, 1998) was an American professional tennis and handball player, who invented racquetball in 1949; originally called "paddle rackets". Sobek founded the National Paddle Rackets Association in 1952 and was the first person ever to be inducted into the Racquetball Hall of Fame.

References 

1918 births
1998 deaths
American racquetball players
Sports inventors and innovators
20th-century American inventors
YMCA leaders